The Incitement to Disaffection Act (Ireland) 1797 (37 Geo 3 c 40 (I)) was an Act of the Parliament of the Kingdom of Ireland. It made equivalent provision to the Incitement to Mutiny Act 1797 for Ireland.

This Act was repealed for Northern Ireland by Group 2 of Part 1 of Schedule 1 to the Statute Law (Repeals) Act 1998.

This Act was repealed for the Republic of Ireland by section 1 of, and the Schedule to, the Statute Law Revision (Pre-Union Irish Statutes) Act 1962.

The death penalty for the offence under this Act of maliciously and advisedly endeavouring to seduce any person or persons serving in His Majesty's Forces by sea or land from his or their duty and allegiance to His Majesty, or inciting or stirring up any such person or persons to commit any act of mutiny, or to make or endeavour to make any mutinous assembly, or to commit any traitorous or mutinous practice whatsoever, was reduced to transportation for life by section 1 of the Punishment of Offences Act (1837). It was reduced again to penal servitude for life by section 2 of the Penal Servitude Act 1857, and to imprisonment for life by section 1(1) of the Criminal Justice Act (Northern Ireland) 1953.

See also
Mutiny Acts
Incitement to Disaffection Act 1934

References

Acts of the Parliament of Ireland (pre-1801)
1797 in law
1797 in Ireland